Gunvor Björhäll (born 20 April 1922) is a Swedish female curler.

Teams

References

External links
 
Svensk Curling nr 1 2013 by Svenska Curlingförbundet - issuu (page 12-13, "Inga Arfwidsson")

1922 births
Possibly living people
Swedish female curlers
European curling champions
Swedish curling champions